Nordvestfyenske Jernbane (Railway of Northwest Funen, abbreviated OMB for "Odense–Middelfart–Bogense") was a Danish railway from Odense to Middelfart via Brenderup, with a branch from Brenderup to Bogense.

The line was closed on 31 March 1966, simultaneously with the two other railways on northern Funen, NFJ and OKMJ. The tracks have been removed, although the line remains as a rail trail in a number of places, and remarkably, all station buildings remain in existence as of 2002.

References

External links 
 OMB details at South Funen Heritage Railway's website

Railway lines opened in 1911
Railway companies established in 1911
Railway companies disestablished in 1966
Closed railway lines in Denmark
1911 establishments in Denmark
1966 disestablishments in Denmark